The 2022 US Open – Women's singles qualifying is a series of tennis matches that will take place from August 23 to 26, 2022 to determine the sixteen qualifiers into the main draw of the women's singles tournament, and, if necessary, the lucky losers.

Seeds

Qualifiers

Lucky losers

Qualifying draw

First qualifier

Second qualifier

Third qualifier

Fourth qualifier

Fifth qualifier

Sixth qualifier

Seventh qualifier

Eighth qualifier

Ninth qualifier

Tenth qualifier

Eleventh qualifier

Twelfth qualifier

Thirteenth qualifier

Fourteenth qualifier

Fifteenth qualifier

Sixteenth qualifier

External links
  Women's singles qualifying draw

Women's singles qualifying
US Open (tennis) by year – Qualifying